The , also called  were a trio of aircraft-carrying cruiser submarines built for the Imperial Japanese Navy (IJN) during the 1930s. All three participated in the Pacific War and were lost.

Design and description
The submarines of the A1 type were versions of the preceding J3 class with superior range, improved aircraft installation. Unlike the earlier boats, they were equipped with extensive communication facilities to allow them to serve as squadron flagships. They displaced  surfaced and  submerged.

For surface running, the boats were powered by two  diesel engines, each driving one propeller shaft. When submerged each propeller was driven by a  electric motor. They could reach  on the surface and  underwater.

The boats were armed with six internal bow  torpedo tubes and carried a total of 18 torpedoes. They were also armed with a single 40-caliber  deck gun and two twin  Type 96 anti-aircraft guns.

Unlike the J3 class, the aircraft hangar was integrated into the conning tower and faces forward; the positions of the deck gun and the catapult were exchanged so the aircraft could use the forward motion of the ship to supplement the speed imparted by the catapult. The hangar could be accessed from inside the pressure hull and the floatplane was stowed with its wings folded.

Boats
  was sunk by destroyer USS Frazier in the Aleutians on 11 June 1943.
  was sunk by destroyer USS David W. Taylor and destroyer escort USS Riddle east of Saipan on 4 July 1944.  
  disappeared south of Funafuti after 11 January 1944. The I-11 probably struck a mine laid by USS Terror.
Two more boats were ordered under the 1942 Naval Program, but were later cancelled.

Notes

References
 

Submarine classes
 
Submarine aircraft carriers